William David Tabram (19 January 1909 – 15 April 1992) was a Welsh footballer, noted for his great technical skill. He played for Swansea Town, Port Vale, Hull City, and South Shields in the 1930s.

Career
Tabram played for Crown Mission before having a trial with Preston North End and joining Swansea Town. He joined Port Vale, along with Ken Gunn, for £400 in March 1933. He played 35 Second Division games in the 1933–34 season, and scored one goal in a 3–0 win over Bury at Gigg Lane on 11 September. He left The Old Recreation Ground when he was sold to Hull City in May 1934, and later played for South Shields.

Career statistics
Source:

References

Footballers from Swansea
Welsh footballers
Association football midfielders
Swansea City A.F.C. players
Port Vale F.C. players
Hull City A.F.C. players
South Shields F.C. (1936) players
English Football League players
1909 births
1992 deaths